The Dhallywood Film and Music Awards is organized by New York-based company Time Music. The presence of renowned cultural personalities of the country and the expatriates make it more happening. Every year this award is announced and the ceremony took place in USA.

Award Categories
 Best Actor
 Best Actress
 Best Model (Male)
 Best Model (Female)
 Best Singer (Male)
 Best Singer (Female)
 Best Ramp Model
 Best Anchor
 Lifetime Achievement Award

Award Ceremonies

See also
 National Film Awards
 Meril Prothom Alo Awards

References

Bangladeshi film awards
Awards established in 2002